Parry House is a historic home located at Highland Falls in Orange County, New York. It was built about 1860 and is a two-story frame dwelling on a brick foundation.  It features a slate mansard roof with concave or bell cast sides in the Second Empire style.

It was listed on the National Register of Historic Places in 1982.

References

Houses on the National Register of Historic Places in New York (state)
Houses in Orange County, New York
National Register of Historic Places in Orange County, New York
Second Empire architecture in New York (state)
Houses completed in 1860
Highland Falls, New York